Bruce Sandilands is an Australian visually impaired Paralympic athlete who competed in the 1980 Arnhem Paralympics as a classified "B" athlete in the Men's 400 m and 1500 m. He won a bronze medal in the 1500 m B event. He was also a member of the goalball team. He was from Victoria. He has played blind cricket in Victoria.

References

Paralympic athletes of Australia
Athletes (track and field) at the 1980 Summer Paralympics
Paralympic bronze medalists for Australia
Visually impaired middle-distance runners
Australian blind people
Living people
Year of birth missing (living people)
Medalists at the 1980 Summer Paralympics
Paralympic medalists in athletics (track and field)
Australian male middle-distance runners
20th-century Australian people